László Baranyai (13 January 1920 – 14 December 1984) was a Hungarian gymnast, born in Budapest. He competed in gymnastics events at the 1948 Summer Olympics. He won a bronze medal with the Hungarian team at the 1948 Summer Olympics.

He was married to Erzsébet Balázs.

References

External links
 

1920 births
1984 deaths
Gymnasts from Budapest
Hungarian male artistic gymnasts
Gymnasts at the 1948 Summer Olympics
Olympic gymnasts of Hungary
Olympic bronze medalists for Hungary
Olympic medalists in gymnastics
Medalists at the 1948 Summer Olympics
20th-century Hungarian people